Dipannita Sharma (born 2 November 1979) is an Indian actress and model.

Career
Sharma came into the limelight after making it to the final five of the Miss India 1998 contest. She also won 'Miss Photogenic' title in the same contest. She has walked the ramp for all major designers in the country and for international design houses such as Valentino & Fendi in India. She was the worldwide face of the press campaign for Breguet watches and jewellery for 5 years. She has endorsed and been the face of several skin care brands in India such as Garnier, Nivea and Dettol soap. She has also hosted television shows, been a judge on a fashion based show on MTV - MTV making the cut and acted in the lead role on a show called Life Nahi Hai Laddoo before making her film debut with the 2002 Bollywood film 16 December.

Personal life
Dipannita was born in the Oil India Limited colony town of Duliajan in Assam. Her father was a doctor in the O.I.L. Hospital. She studied in the Holy Child School Guwahati till her ninth standard, and pursued the rest of her school academics from St. Mary's school, Naharkatia. She later graduated in History from Indraprastha College for Women, Delhi.

Dipannita is married to Delhi entrepreneur Dilsher Singh Atwal, a third generation businessman, and who is into his family business of mining,
and lives in Mumbai, India. Her younger sister is a television actress Arunima Sharma who is best known for her role as Rano in the soap opera Kasamh Se.

Filmography

Films

Shows/Short films/Web series

Music videos

See also

List of Indian film actresses

References

External links

Female models from Assam
Indian film actresses
Actresses in Assamese cinema
Actresses in Hindi cinema
Living people
1976 births
People from Dibrugarh district
Indraprastha College for Women alumni
Actresses from Assam
Fear Factor: Khatron Ke Khiladi participants